The 2010–11 Biathlon World Cup - World Cup 6 was held in Antholz, Italy, from 20 January until 23 January 2011.

Schedule of events 
The time schedule of the event stands below

Medal winners

Men

Women

Achievements

 Best performance for all time

 , 1st place in Sprint
 , 8th place in Sprint
 , 20th place in Sprint
 , 89th place in Sprint
 , 95th place in Sprint
 , 15th place in Sprint
 , 25th place in Sprint
 , 33rd place in Sprint
 , 42nd place in Sprint
 , 63rd place in Sprint

 First World Cup race

 , 13th place in Sprint
 , 85th place in Sprint
 , 90th place in Sprint

References 

- World Cup 6, 2010-11 Biathlon World Cup
Biathlon
January 2011 sports events in Europe
Biathlon competitions in Italy